The Linear Pottery culture (LBK) is a major archaeological horizon of the European Neolithic period, flourishing . Derived from the German Linearbandkeramik, it is also known as the Linear Band Ware, Linear Ware, Linear Ceramics or Incised Ware culture, falling within the Danubian I culture of V. Gordon Childe.

Most cultural evidence has been found on the middle Danube, the upper and middle Elbe, and the upper and middle Rhine. It represents a major event in the initial spread of agriculture in Europe. The pottery consists of simple cups, bowls, vases, jugs without handles and, in a later phase, with pierced lugs, bases, and necks.

Important sites include Vrable and Nitra in Slovakia; Bylany in the Czech Republic; Langweiler and Zwenkau (Eythra) in Germany; Brunn am Gebirge in Austria; Elsloo, Sittard, Köln-Lindenthal, Aldenhoven, Flomborn, and Rixheim on the Rhine; Lautereck and Hienheim on the upper Danube; and Rössen and Sonderhausen on the middle Elbe. In 2019, two large Rondel complexes were discovered east of the Vistula River near Toruń in Poland.

A number of cultures ultimately replaced the Linear Pottery culture over its range, but without a one-to-one correspondence between its variants and the replacing cultures. Some of the successor cultures are the Hinkelstein, Großgartach, Rössen, Lengyel, Cucuteni-Trypillian, and Boian-Maritza cultures.

Name

The term "Linear Band Ware" derives from the pottery's decorative technique. The "Band Ware" or  part of it began as an innovation of the German archaeologist, Friedrich Klopfleisch (1831–1898). The earliest generally accepted name in English was the Danubian of V. Gordon Childe. Most names in English are attempts to translate .

Since Starčevo-Körös pottery was earlier than the LBK and was located in a contiguous food-producing region, the early investigators looked for precedents there. Much of the Starčevo-Körös pottery features decorative patterns composed of convolute bands of paint: spirals, converging bands, vertical bands, and so on. The LBK appears to imitate and often improve these convolutions with incised lines; hence the term, linear, to distinguish incised band ware from painted band ware.
The name depends on specialized meanings of "linear" and "band", whether in English or in German. Unfortunately these words without the qualifiers do not describe the decoration. There are few bands going around the pottery and the lines are mainly not straight.

Geography and chronology

The LBK did not begin with this range and only reached it toward the end of its time. It began in regions of densest occupation on the middle Danube (Bohemia, Moravia, Hungary) and spread over about  along the rivers in 360 years.

The LBK was concentrated somewhat inland from the coastal areas; i.e., it is not evidenced in Denmark or the northern coastal strips of Germany and Poland, or the coast of the Black Sea in Romania. The northern coastal regions remained occupied by Mesolithic cultures exploiting the then rich Atlantic salmon runs. There are lighter concentrations of LBK in the Netherlands, such as at Elsloo, Netherlands, with the sites of Darion, Remicourt, Fexhe, or Waremme-Longchamps and at the mouths of the Oder and Vistula. Evidently, the Neolithics and Mesolithics were not excluding each other.

The LBK at maximum extent ranged from about the line of the Seine–Oise (Paris Basin) eastward to the line of the Dnieper, and southward to the line of the upper Danube down to the big bend. An extension ran through the Southern Bug valley, leaped to the valley of the Dniester, and swerved southward from the middle Dniester to the lower Danube in eastern Romania, east of the Carpathians.

Periodization
A good many C-14 dates have been acquired on the LBK, making possible statistical analyses, which have been performed on different sample groups. One such analysis by Stadler and Lennais sets 68.2% confidence limits at about 5430–5040 BC; that is, 68.2% of possible dates allowed by variation of the major factors that influence measurement, calculation, and calibration fall within that range. The 95.4% confidence interval is 5600–4750 BC.

Data continue to be acquired and therefore any one analysis should be taken as a rough guideline only. Overall, it is probably safe to say that the Linear Pottery culture spanned several hundred years of continental European prehistory in the late sixth and early fifth millennia BC, with local variations. Data from Belgium indicate a late survival of LBK there, as late as 4100 BC.

The Linear Pottery culture is not the only food-producing player on the stage of prehistoric Europe. It has been necessary, therefore, to distinguish between it and the Neolithic, which was most easily done by dividing the Neolithic of Europe into chronological phases. These have varied a great deal. An approximation is:
 Early Neolithic, 6000–5500. The first appearance of food-producing cultures in the south of the future Linear Pottery culture range: the Körös of southern Hungary and the Dniester culture in Ukraine.
 Middle Neolithic, 5500–5000. Early and Middle Linear Pottery culture.
 Late Neolithic, 5000–4500. Late Linear Pottery and legacy cultures.

The last phase is no longer the end of the Neolithic. A "Final Neolithic" has been added to the transition between the Neolithic and the Bronze Age. All numbers depend to some extent on the geographic region.

The pottery styles of the LBK allow some division of its window in time. Conceptual schemes have varied somewhat. One is:
 Early: The Eastern and Western LBK cultures, originating on the middle Danube
 Middle: Musical Note pottery – the incised lines of the decoration are broken or terminated by punctures, or "strokes", giving the appearance of musical notes. The culture expanded to its maximum extent, and regional variants appeared. One variant is the late Bug-Dniester culture.
 Late: Stroked pottery – lines of punctures are substituted for the incised lines.

Early or Western

The early or earliest Western Linear Pottery culture began conventionally at 5500 BC, possibly as early as 5700 BC, developed on the middle Danube, including western Hungary, and was carried down the Rhine, Elbe, Oder, and Vistula. It is sometimes called the Central European Linear Pottery (CELP) to distinguish it from the ALP phase of the Eastern Linear Pottery culture. In Hungarian, it tends to be called DVK, translated as "Transdanubian Linear Pottery". A number of local styles and phases of ware are defined.

The end of the early phase can be dated to its arrival in the Netherlands at about 5200 BC. The population there was already food-producing to some extent. The early phase went on there, but meanwhile the Music Note Pottery phase of the Middle Linear Band Pottery culture appeared in Austria at about 5200 BC and moved eastward into Romania and the Ukraine. The late phase, or Stroked Pottery culture ( (SBK), 5000–4500 BC) evolved in central Europe and went eastward, moving down the Vistula and Elbe.

Eastern
The Eastern Linear Pottery culture developed in eastern Hungary and Transylvania roughly contemporaneously with, perhaps a few hundred years after, the Transdanubian. The great plain there (Hungarian Alföld) had been occupied by the Starčevo-Körös-Criş culture of "gracile Mediterraneans" from the Balkans as early as 6100 BC. Hertelendi and others give a reevaluated date range of 5860–5330 for the Early Neolithic, 5950–5400 for the Körös. The Körös Culture went as far north as the edge of the upper Tisza and stopped. North of it the Alföld plain and the Bükk Mountains were intensively occupied by Mesolithics thriving on the flint tool trade.

At around 5330 BC, the classical Alföld culture of the LBK appeared to the north of the Körös culture and flourished until about 4940. This time also is the Middle Neolithic. The Alföld culture has been abbreviated AVK from its Hungarian name, Alföldi Vonaldíszes Kerámia, or ALP for Alföld Linear Pottery culture, the earliest variant of the Eastern Linear Pottery culture.

In one view, the AVK came "directly out of" the Körös. The brief, short-ranged Szatmár group on the northern edge of the Körös culture seems transitional. Some place it with the Körös, some with the AVK. The latter's pottery is decorated with white painted bands with incised edges. Körös pottery was painted.

As is presented above, however, no major population movements occurred across the border. The Körös went on into a late phase in its accustomed place, 5770–5230. The late Körös is also called the Proto-Vinča, which was succeeded by the Vinča-Tordo, 5390–4960. There is no necessity to view the Körös and the AVK as closely connected. The AVK economy is somewhat different: it used cattle and swine, both of which occur wild in the region, instead of the sheep of the Balkans and Mediterranean. The percentage of wild animal bones is greater. Barley, millet and lentils were added.

Around 5100 or so, towards the end of the Middle Neolithic, the classical AVK descended into a complex of pronounced local groups called the Szakálhát-Esztár-Bükk, which flourished about 5260–4880:
 The Szakálhát group was located on the lower and middle Tisza and the Körös Rivers, taking the place of the previous Körös culture. Its pottery went on with the painted white bands and incised edge.
 The Esztár group to the north featured pottery with bands painted in dark paint.
 The Szilmeg group was located in the foothills of the Bükk Mountains.
 The Tiszadob group was located in the Sajó Valley.
 The Bükk group was located in the mountains.

These are all characterised by finely crafted and decorated ware. The entire group is considered by the majority of the sources listed in this article to have been in the LBK. Before the chronology and many of the sites were known, the Bükk was thought to be a major variant; in fact, Gimbutas at one point believed it to be identical with the Eastern Linear Pottery culture. Since 1991, the predominance of the Alföld has come to light.

The end of the Eastern Linear Pottery culture and the LBK is less certain. The Szakálhát-Esztár-Bükk descended into another Late Neolithic legacy complex, the Tisza-Hérpály-Csöszhalom, which is either not LBK or is transitional from the LBK to the Tiszapolgar, a successor culture.

Origins
The origin of the culture must be distinguished from the origin of the people who used it.

Culture

The earliest theory of Linear Pottery culture origin is that it came from the Starčevo-Körös culture of Serbia and Hungary. Supporting this view is the fact that the LBK appeared earliest about 5600–5400 BC on the middle Danube in the Starčevo range. Presumably, the expansion northwards of early Starčevo-Körös produced a local variant reaching the upper Tisza that may have well been created by contact with native epi-Paleolithic people. This small group began a new tradition of pottery, substituting engravings for the paintings of the Balkanic cultures.

A site at Brunn am Gebirge just south of Vienna seems to document the transition to LBK. The site was densely settled in a long house pattern around 5550–5200. The lower layers feature Starčevo-type plain pottery, with large number of stone tools made of material from near Lake Balaton, Hungary. Over the time frame, LBK pottery and animal husbandry increased, while the use of stone tools decreased.

A second theory proposes an autochthonous development out of the local Mesolithic cultures. Although the Starčevo-Körös entered southern Hungary about 6000 BC and the LBK spread very rapidly, there appears to be a hiatus of up to 500 years in which a barrier seems to have been in effect. Moreover, the cultivated species of the near and middle eastern Neolithic do not do well over the Linear Pottery culture range. And finally, the Mesolithics in the region prior to the LBK used some domestic species, such as wheat and flax. The La Hoguette culture on the northwest of the LBK range developed their own food production from native plants and animals.

A third theory attributes the start of Linear Pottery to an influence from the Mesolithic cultures of the east European plain. The pottery was used in intensive food gathering.

The rate at which it spread was no faster than the spread of the Neolithic in general. Accordingly, Dolukhanov and others postulate that an impulse from the steppe to the southeast of the barrier stimulated the Mesolithics north of it to innovate their own pottery. This view only accounts for the pottery; presumably, the Mesolithics combined it de novo with local food production, which began to spread very rapidly throughout a range that was already producing some food.

Population

The initial LBK population theory hypothesized that the culture was spread by farmers moving up the Danube practicing slash-and-burn methods. The presence of the Mediterranean sea shell, Spondylus gaederopus, and the similarity of the pottery to gourds, which did not grow in the north, seemed to be evidence of the immigration, as does the genetic evidence cited below.  The lands into which they moved were believed untenanted or too sparsely populated by hunter-gatherers to be a significant factor.

The barrier causing the hiatus mentioned above does not have an immediate geographical cause. The Körös culture ended in the middle of the Hungarian plain, and although the climate to the north is colder, the gradient is not so sharp as to form a barrier there.

Genetic evidence

In 2005, scientists successfully sequenced mtDNA coding region 15997–16409 derived from twenty-four 7,500- to 7,000-year-old human remains associated with the LBK culture. Of those remains, 22 were from locations in Germany near the Harz Mountains and the upper Rhine Valley, while one was from Austria and one from Hungary. The scientists did not reveal the detailed hypervariable segment I (HVSI) sequences for all the samples, but identified that seven of the samples belonged to H or V branch of the mtDNA phylogenetic tree, six belonged to the N1a branch, five belonged to the T branch, four belonged to the K(U8) branch, one belonged to the J branch, and one belonged to the U3 branch. All branches are extant in the current European population, although the K branch was present in roughly twice the percentages as would be found in Europe today (15% vs. 8% now.).

Comparison of the N1a HVSI sequences with sequences of living individuals found three of them to correspond with those of individuals currently living in Europe. Two of the sequences corresponded to ancestral nodes predicted to exist or to have existed on the European branch of the phylogenetic tree. One of the sequences is related to European populations, but with no apparent descendants amongst the modern population.
The N1a evidence supports the notion that the descendants of LBK culture have lived in Europe for more than 7,000 years and have become an integral part of the current European population.  The lack of mtDNA haplogroup U5 supports the notion that U5 at this time is uniquely associated with mesolithic European cultures.

A 2010 study of ancient DNA suggested the LBK population had affinities to modern-day populations from the Near East and Anatolia, such as an overall prevalence of G2. The study also found some unique features, such as the prevalence of the now-rare Y-haplogroup H2 and mitochondrial haplogroup frequencies. However subsequent studies based on full-genome analysis have found that the LBK population was similar genetically to modern southern Europeans, and did not resemble modern Near Eastern or Anatolian populations. Neolithic Anatolian farmers have also been found to be more similar to modern southern Europeans than to modern Near Easterners or Anatolians.

Lipson et al. (2017) and Narasimhan et al. (2019) analyzed a large number of skeletons ascribed to the Linear Pottery Culture. Most of the Y-DNA belonged to G2a and subclades of it, some to I2 and subclades of it, beside few samples of T1a, CT, and C1a2. The samples of mtDNA extracted were various subclades of T, H, N, U, K, J, X, HV, and V.

Economy

Land use

The LBK people settled on fluvial terraces and in the proximities of rivers. They were quick to identify regions of fertile loess. On it they raised a distinctive assemblage of crops and associated weeds in small plots, an economy that Gimbutas called a "garden type of civilization". The difference between a crop and a weed in LBK contexts is the frequency. Crop foods are:
 Triticum dicoccum, emmer wheat
 Triticum monococcum, einkorn wheat
 Pisum sativum, pea
 Lens culinaris, lentil
Species that are found so rarely as to warrant classification as possible weeds are:
 Hordeum, barley
 Panicum miliaceum, broom corn millet
 Secale cereale rye
 Vicia ervilia, bitter vetch
 Vicia faba, broad or field bean
The emmer and the einkorn were sometimes grown as maslin, or mixed crops. The lower-yield einkorn predominates over emmer, which has been attributed to its better resistance to heavy rain. Hemp (Cannabis sativum) and flax (Linum usitatissimum) gave the LBK people the raw material of rope and cloth, which they no doubt manufactured at home as a cottage industry. From poppies (Papaver somniferum), introduced later from the Mediterranean, they may have manufactured palliative medicine.

The LBK people were stock-raisers as well, with cattle favoured, though goats and swine are also recorded. Like farmers today, they may have used the better grain for themselves and the lower grades for the animals. The ubiquitous dogs are present here too, but scantly. Substantial wild faunal remains are found. The LBK supplemented their diets by hunting deer and wild boar in the open forests of Europe as it was then.

A 2022 study by the University of Bristol found dairy fat residues in pottery dating as early as 7,400 years ago. Researchers analyzed residues from over 4,300 vessels recovered from 70 LBK archaeological sites. Milk use was detected in about 65% of these Neolithic sites.

Demographic history 

Although no significant population transfers were associated with the start of the LBK, population diffusion along the wetlands of the mature civilisation (about 5200 BC) had levelled the high percentage of the rare gene sequence mentioned above by the late LBK. The population was much greater by then, a phenomenon termed the Neolithic demographic transition (NDT). According to Bocquet-Appel beginning from a stable population of "small connected groups exchanging migrants" among the "hunter-gatherers and horticulturalists" the LBK experienced an increase in birth rate caused by a "reduction in the length of the birth interval". The author hypothesizes a decrease in the weaning period made possible by division of labor. At the end of the LBK, the NDT was over and the population growth disappeared due to an increase in the mortality rate, caused, the author speculates, by new pathogens passed along by increased social contact.

The new population was sedentary up to the capacity of the land, and then the excess population moved to less-inhabited land. An in-depth GIS study by Ebersbach and Schade of an  region in the wetlands region of Wetterau, Hesse, traces the land use in detail and discovers the limiting factor. In the study region, 82% of the land is suitable for agriculture, 11% for grazing (even though wetland), and 7% steep slopes. The investigators found that the LBK occupied this land for about 400 years. They began with 14 settlements, 53 houses, and 318 people, using the wetlands for cattle pasture. Settlement gradually spread over the wetlands, reaching a maximum of 47 settlements, 122 houses, and 732 people in the late period. At that time, all the available grazing land was in use.

Toward the end, the population suddenly dropped to initial levels, though much of the arable land was still available. The investigators concluded cattle were the main economic interest and available grazing land was the limiting factor in settlement. The Neolithic of the Middle East featured urban concentrations of people subsisting mainly on grain. Beef and dairy products, however, were the mainstay of LBK diet. When the grazing lands were all in use, they moved elsewhere in search of them. As the relatively brief window of the LBK falls roughly in the centre of the Atlantic climate period, a maximum of temperature and rainfall, a conclusion that the spread of wetlands at that time encouraged the growth and spreading of the LBK is to some degree justified.

With some exceptions, population levels rose rapidly at the beginning of the Neolithic until they reached the carrying capacity. This was followed by a population collapse of "enormous magnitude" after 5000 BC, with levels remaining low during the next 1,500 years.

Investigation of the Neolithic skeletons found in the Talheim Death Pit (c. 5000 BC) suggests that prehistoric men from neighboring tribes were prepared to fight and kill each other in order to capture and secure women. The mass grave at Talheim in southern Germany is one of the earliest known sites in the archaeological record that shows evidence of organised violence in Early Neolithic Europe, among various LBK tribes. 
Other speculations as to the reasons for violence between settlements include vengeance, conflicts over land and resources, and kidnapping slaves. Some of these theories related to the lack of resources are supported by the discovery that various LBK fortifications bordering indigenously inhabited areas appear to have not been in use for very long. Mass burial site at Schletz was also fortified, which serves as evidence of violent conflict among tribes and means that these fortifications were built as a form of defense against aggressor. The massacre of Schletz occurred at the same time as the massacre at Talheim and several other known massacres.

Material culture

Tool kit
The tool kit was appropriate to the economy. Flint and obsidian were the main materials used for points and cutting edges. There is no sign of metal. For example, they harvested with sickles manufactured by inserting flint blades into the inside of curved pieces of wood. One tool, the "shoe-last celt", was made of a ground stone chisel blade tied to a handle, with shape and wear showing that they were used as adzes to fell trees and to work wood. Augers were made of flint points tied to sticks that could be rotated. Scrapers and knives are found in abundance. The use of flint pieces, or microliths, descended from the Mesolithic, while the ground stone is characteristic of the Neolithic.

These materials are evidence both of specialization of labor and commerce. The flint used came from southern Poland; the obsidian came from the Bükk and Tatra mountains. Settlements in those regions specialized in mining and manufacture. The products were exported to all the other LBK regions, which must have had something to trade. This commerce is a strong argument for an ethnic unity between the scattered pockets of the culture.

Settlement patterns

Outer walls were wattle-and-daub, sometimes alternating with split logs, with slanted, thatched roofs, supported by rows of poles, three across. The exterior wall of the home was solid and massive, oak posts being preferred. Clay for the daub was dug from pits near the house, which were then used for storage. Extra posts at one end may indicate a partial second story. Some LBK houses were occupied for as long as 30 years. Linear Pottery longhouses were the largest free-standing buildings in the world at the time.

It is thought that these houses had no windows and only one doorway. The door was located at one end of the house. Internally, the house had one or two partitions creating up to three areas. Interpretations of the use of these areas vary. Working activities might be carried out in the better lit door end, the middle used for sleeping and eating and the end farthest from the door could have been used for grain storage. According to another view, the interior was divided in areas for sleeping, common life and a fenced enclosure at the back end for keeping animals.

Ditches went along part of the outer walls, especially at the enclosed end. Their purpose is not known, but they probably are not defensive works, as they were not much of a defense. More likely, the ditches collected waste water and rain water. 

Trash was regularly removed and placed in external pits. The waste-producing work, such as hide preparation and flint-working, was done outside the house.

Pottery has been found in long houses, as well as in graves. Analysis of the home pottery reveals that each house had its own tradition. The occurrence of pottery primarily in female graves indicates the women of the long house probably made the pottery; in fact, lineages have been defined. Gimbutas goes so far as to assert, "The indirect results indicate an endogamous, matrilocal residence."

Easy access to fresh water also would have been mandatory, which is another reason why settlements were in bottom lands near water. A number of timber-built wells from the times have been discovered, with a log-cabin type lining constructed one layer at a time as the previous layers sank into the well. Analysis of preserved wells has shown that the LBK culture possessed sophisticated carpentry skills and were capable of complex timber constructions. 

The LBK culture also built timber trackways, the remains of some of which have been preserved, for example at the Campemoor bog in Lower Saxony (Germany), dated to c. 4630–4550 BC (trackway Pr31). 

Nearby villages formed settlement cells, some as dense as 20 per , others as sparse as one per . This structuring of settlements does not support a view that the LBK population had no social structure, or was anarchic. However, the structure remains obscure and interpretational. One long house may have supported one extended family, but the short lifespan would have precluded more than two generations. The houses required too much labor to be the residences of single families; consequently, communal houses are postulated. Though the known facts are tantalizing, the correct social interpretation of the layout of a long house and the arrangement of villages will have to wait for clearer evidence. At least some villages were fortified for some time with a palisade and outer ditch.

The LBK settlement at Vrable in Slovakia had an estimated 70 contemporaneous longhouses and a population of up to 1725 people at its peak in c. 5100 BC, making it one of the largest LBK settlements of the period. The longhouses were grouped into three 'neighbourhoods', one of which was surrounded by trenches and a palisade. The remains of at least 313 longhouses have been found at the Vrable site. The remains of 300 longhouses have also been found at the settlement of Eythra in Germany, indicating a similar sized-population within the same time-frame as that at Vrable.

Excavations at Oslonki in Poland revealed a large, fortified settlement (dating to 4300 BC, i.e., Late LBK), covering an area of 4000m2. Nearly 30 trapezoidal longhouses and over 80 graves were discovered. They were built of massive timber posts chinked with wattle and daub mortar.

An earlier view saw the Linear Pottery culture as living a "peaceful, unfortified lifestyle". Since then, as well as settlements with palisades, weapon-traumatized skeletons have also been discovered, such as at Herxheim in Germany. Whether it was the site of a massacre or of a martial ritual, the Herxheim remains demonstrate "systematic violence between groups". In 2015 a study published in Proceedings of the National Academy of Sciences detailed findings at a site near Schöneck-Kilianstädten, including the skeletons of 26 adults and children who were killed by "devastating strikes to the head or arrow wounds." The skull fractures are classic signs of blunt force injuries caused by basic stone age weapons. Most of the known settlements, however, left no trace of violence.

Religion

As is true of all prehistoric cultures, the details of actual belief systems maintained by the Linear Pottery culture population are poorly understood relative to beliefs and religions of historical periods. The extent to which prehistoric beliefs formed a systematic religious canon is also the subject of some debate. Nevertheless, comparative, detailed, scientific study of cultural artifacts and iconography has led to the proposal of models.

The mother goddess model is the major one applied to the Neolithic of the middle and near east, the civilization of the Aegean and Europe. The iconography was inherited from the Palaeolithic. The Gravettian culture introduced it into the range of the future LBK from western Asia and south Russia. From there, it diffused throughout Europe in the Upper Palaeolithic, which was inhabited by Cro-Magnon man and was responsible for many works of art, such as the Venus of Willendorf.

With the transition to the Neolithic, "the female principle continued to predominate the cultures that had grown up around the mysterious processes of birth and generation." The LBK, therefore, did not bring anything new spiritually to Europe, nor was the cult in any way localized to Europe. It is reflected in the vase paintings, figurines, graves and grave goods, and surviving customs and myths of Europe. In the north, the goddess could manifest herself as the mistress of animals, grain, distaff and loom, household, and life and death.

The works of the noted late archaeologist Marija Gimbutas present a major study of the iconography and surviving beliefs of the European Neolithic, including the Linear Pottery culture. She was able to trace the unity of reproductive themes in cultural objects previously unsuspected of such themes. For example, the burial pits of the Linear Pottery culture, which were lined with stone, clay, or plaster, may have been intended to represent eggs. The deceased returns to the egg, so to speak, there to await rebirth.

The presence of such pits contemporaneously with the burial of women and children under the floors of houses suggests a multiplicity of religious convictions, as does the use of both cremation and inhumation. Some of the figurines are not of females, but are androgynous. Perhaps the beliefs of Europeans of any culture always were complex.

Funerary customs
The early Neolithic in Europe featured burials of women and children under the floors of personal residences. Remains of adult males are missing. Probably, Neolithic culture featured sex discrimination in funerary customs, and women and children were important in ideology concerning the home.

Burials beneath the floors of homes continued until about 4000 BC. However, in the Balkans and central Europe, the cemetery also came into use at about 5000 BC. LBK cemeteries contained from 20 to 200 graves arranged in groups that appear to have been based on kinship. Males and females of any age were included. Both cremation and inhumation were practiced. The inhumed were placed in a flexed position in pits lined with stones, plaster, or clay. Cemeteries were close to, but distinct from, residential areas.

The presence of grave goods indicates both a sex and a dominance discrimination. Male graves included stone celts, flint implements, and money or jewelry of Spondylus shells. Female graves contained many of the same artifacts as male graves, but also most of the pottery and containers of ochre. The goods have been interpreted as gifts to the departed or personal possessions.

Only about 30% of the graves have goods. This circumstance has been interpreted as some sort of distinction in dominance, but the exact nature is not known. If the goods were gifts, then some were more honored than others; if they were possessions, then some were wealthier than others.

These practices are contrasted to mass graves, such as the Talheim Death Pit and the Herxheim archeological site. Herxheim was a ritual center and a mass grave that contained the scattered remains of at least 450 individuals.

See also

References

Bibliography

 Braidwood, Robert, Prehistoric men, William Morrow and Company, many editions

Further reading

External links

Reconstruction of a Neolithic longhouse (2021) Halle State Museum of Prehistory (video in German – English subtitles available)
The People from Longhouses 3D reconstructions

 Below are some relevant links to sites publishing current research or recapitulating recent thinking concerning the Neolithic of Europe. Many of the sites referenced contain links to other sites not mentioned here.

Overall

Models

Dates

   Select Zur Absolutchronologie der Linearbandkeramik and under that Abb.01 for the calibration curve and Abb.02 for the sample frequency per year.

People

 
  
  The article includes an extensive bibliography.
  Dienekes summarizes and reviews  No charge for abstract. The article is also reviewed by 
 Hawks reviews and comments on three articles.
Graphic reconstruction of the Linear Pottery: Everyday life by Karol Schauer 1
Graphic reconstruction of the Linear Pottery: Everyday life by Karol Schauer 3
Graphic reconstruction of the Linear Pottery: Everyday life by Karol Schauer 4

Places

Economy

 
 

 
6th-millennium BC establishments
5th-millennium BC disestablishments
Archaeological cultures of Central Europe
Archaeological cultures of Western Europe
Neolithic cultures of Europe
Archaeological cultures in Austria
Archaeological cultures in Belgium
Archaeological cultures in the Czech Republic
Archaeological cultures in France
Archaeological cultures in Germany
Archaeological cultures in Hungary
Archaeological cultures in Moldova
Archaeological cultures in the Netherlands
Archaeological cultures in Poland
Archaeological cultures in Romania
Archaeological cultures in Slovakia
Archaeological cultures in Switzerland
Archaeological cultures in Ukraine
Ancient pottery